The Statute of Bigamy (Statutum de Bigamis, 4 Edw. I) was an English law passed in 1276. It encompassed six chapters on a variety of subjects, but took its name from the fifth chapter, which removed benefit of clergy from men found to have committed bigamy by an ecclesiastical court.

The legislation was passed in the fourth year of the reign of Edward I. The statute was an adoption of the council of Lyon decision of  omni priviligio  clericali  nudati et coercioni fori secularis addicti during 1274. The stratatum  treated the misdemeanor as an act of  capital crime. At the time of the law having been brought into force,  clergy considering bigamous occurrences already within their number were desiring that punishment be decided via the common law in order that those persons be treated less severely,   Pope Gregory X decreed otherwise. By the time of the son of king Henry the VIII in the 16th century, the king of England by statute had had the prospective clerical impediment issue revoked.

References

External links
Donald J. Kiser (the New York Public Library)books.google.co.uk Corpus juris: being a complete and systematic statement of the whole body of the law as embodied in and developed by all reported decisions Volume 7,   American Law Book Co., 1916

Medieval English law
1276 in England
1270s in law
Christianity in medieval England